100 dragspel och en flicka ("100 Accordions and One Girl") is a Swedish comedy film from 1946 directed by Ragnar Frisk. The film's title is a reference to One Hundred Men and a Girl.

Plot
Two inventors, Ville and Rulle (Elof Ahrle and Bengt Logardt) have developed a revolutionary new accordion; however, they have competition. Twelve-year-old Pelle Borell (Anders Nyström) gets to show off the instrument in front of the Swedish accordion elite in Stockholm.

Reception
The film was positively received at the time of its release, with Elof Ahrle receiving particular praise.
Stockholmstidningen wrote: "Ahrle gets his best comical role in a long time". Aftontidningen wrote: "A film that will go straight into the Swedish people's heart. Elof Ahrle's character has the potential to become a future classic." Expressen gave the film a more negative review, while still praising Ahrle.

Release 
The film was first screened in Sundsvall on 31 January 1946.

Selected cast 
 Elof Ahrle – Ville Karlsson
 Ingrid Backlin – Siv Jonsson
 Bengt Logardt –  Rudolf Berg
 Anita Björk – Elsa Borell
 Gösta Cederlund – grandfather Julius "Julle" Borell
 Anders Nyström – Pelle Borell, Elsa's brother
 Carl-Gunnar Wingård – factory owner Jonsson, Siv's father, owner of Svenska Dragspelsfabriken
 Bertil Berglund – Nils Andersson-Grip, supervisor of Svenska Dragspelsfabriken
 Evert Granholm – Hjelm, representative of Speilmans Dragspelsfabrik
 Arne Lindblad – manager Speilman, owner of Speilmans Dragspelfabrik
 Stina Sorbon –Viola
 Birgit Johannesson – Miss Lange, guest at restaurant Verona
 Sigge Fürst – host
 Lasse Benny – accordion player
 Stefan Dahlén – accordion player
 Allan Eriksson – accordion player
 Erik Frank – accordion player
 Karl Grönstedt – accordion player
 Hans-Erik Nääs – accordion player
 Sölve Strand – accordion player
 Ivan Thelmé – accordion player
 Andrew Walter – accordion player
 Gösta Westerlund – accordion player

DVD 
The film was released on DVD in 2004.

References

External links 
 100 dragspel och en flicka at the Swedish Film Database
 

1946 films
1946 comedy films
1940s Swedish-language films
Swedish comedy films
Films directed by Ragnar Frisk
Swedish black-and-white films
1940s Swedish films